Super League VII (styled Tetley's Super League VII due to sponsorship from Tetley's Brewery) was the year 2002's Super League championship season, the 108th season of top-level professional rugby league in Britain, and the seventh run by the Super League. Twelve clubs from across England competed during the season, culminating in the 2002 Super League Grand Final between St. Helens and Bradford Bulls, which St Helens won, claiming their third premiership in four seasons.

Lee Briers of Warrington Wolves scored a record-equalling 5 drop goals against Halifax Blue Sox in the Super League match on 25 May 2002.

Operational rules
Salary cap limits were adjusted in an attempt to make Super League more competitive:
 The cap for money spent on players' salaries was set at £1.8 million per club from the 2002 season. The previous limit had allowed the clubs to spend either £0.75 million per year or a higher amount as long as it was no more than 50% of the clubs "salary cap relevant income".
 The cap change allowed some clubs in Super League to spend more money on players than they had previously but forced a reduction in spending at others. Wigan Warriors were given 12 months' dispensation to spend up to £2.3 million due to existing contract commitments.

Table

Play-offs

Grand Final

References

External links
Super League VII at wigan.rlfans.com
Super League VII at rugbyleagueproject.com